British Rail Class D2/12 was a class of ten locomotives commissioned by British Railways in England. They were diesel powered locomotives in the pre-TOPS period built by Hudswell Clarke with a Gardner engine.  The mechanical transmission, using a scoop control fluid coupling and four-speed Power-flow SSS (synchro-self-shifting) gearbox, was a Hudswell Clarke speciality.

The D2/12 was mechanically similar to the earlier British Rail Class D2/7 but was of more modern appearance.  The engine casing was lower, giving much better all-round visibility.

After British Rail
D2519 was employed at NCB Hatfield Main, Doncaster, South Yorkshire as a shunter. It was located there until at least 1984.

D2511 is preserved at the Keighley and Worth Valley Railway.

See also

 List of British Rail classes

References

Sources

 Ian Allan ABC of British Railways Locomotives, 1966 edition, page 81
 

D002.12
D002.12
Hudswell Clarke locomotives
C locomotives
Railway locomotives introduced in 1961
Standard gauge locomotives of Great Britain